World Without Nazism or WWN is a Russian political organization with ties to Vladimir Putin's government, which claims to campaign against "neo-fascism." 
The group has also been described, by security agencies from Estonia and Latvia, as a Russian propaganda organization, and as a Kremlin-sponsored GONGO,  which aims to advance Russian foreign policies against formerly Soviet-occupied countries and to promote "a Soviet-era approach to World War II". The organization was founded and is led by Boris Spiegel, a Russian oligarch with close ties to Putin. It was founded in Kyiv, Ukraine, on 22 June 2010, and is registered in Strasbourg, France.

The organisation accuses the countries that were formerly part of the Communist Bloc of "rapid nazification." It criticizes the "Western European democracies" for their alleged role in starting World War II and proposes a common history textbook for all of Europe based on "serious scientific study, as well as the decisions of international judicial and political authorities on which basis the postwar world order had been built".

Aims
World Without Nazism has declared its official aims to be:
 establishment of an international "early warning" system, monitoring and prevention of the uprising and spread of nazi ideas and actions;
 establishment of interaction with national, European and international law enforcement and judicial bodies in order to suppress any manifestations of neo-nazism, racism and xenophobia, including glorification of its accomplices, struggle against those who deny Holocaust,
 cooperation with international European organizations, parliaments, public associations overseeing de-nazification processes in the UN member states,
 incorporation into the educational system of the Council of Europe member-states (and further on of other states) of obligatory programs of teaching the Second World War and Holocaust history;
 popularization of publicist materials, films, works of literature and art which cover issues of revival of the nazism threat, the need to struggle against it;
 support of organizations initiating investigation of activities against persons who are accessorial to nazi crimes of the Second World War;
 perpetuation of the memory of victims of the Second World War and Holocaust, heroes of Resistance and Soldiers-Liberators.

According to a member of Russian Public Chamber and founder of a sub-section of World Without Nazism in Russia Alexander Brod, the organization also attempts to protect Russian-speaking citizens in the Baltic States.

Criticism
WWN has been accused of being a GONGO, "a pseudo-independent outfit that a country (usually authoritarian or non-democratic in nature) establishes to mimic an NGO so as to deceive the media, public and other governments." The organisation is under observation by the police in Estonia because security officials allege its membership includes suspected extremists. The organization is described in the Annual Review of the Estonian Security Police as a propaganda organization aimed at promoting "a Soviet-era approach to World War II." According to Estonian security officials, certain members of the organization are radical nationalists who promote Russian chauvinism. The Annual Review states that World Without Nazism cooperates closely with Russian state controlled media channels and Russian Federation embassies in target countries. It also states that WWN's goal is to create a situation according to which questioning Moscow's version of history regarding the Soviet occupation of the Baltic states and The Holodomor is equated with denial of the Holocaust.. Five WWN members who are also members of the New York State Assembly wrote an open letter to the Prime Minister of Estonia Andrus Ansip objecting against calling the WWN extremist.

According to V. Likhachev, a Ukrainian Congress of Ethnic Communities official, WWN accuses selected governments unsympathetic to Russia of anti-semitism, radical nationalism, support of neo-fascists, Holocaust denial, hindering the prosecution of alleged Nazi war criminals and revisionist politics toward the consequences of the Great Patriotic War. Likhachev also alleges that the allegations are not directed against Kremlin-friendly authoritarian regimes and that WWN is profoundly focused on instances of anti-semitism by the government of Georgia, which is pro-Israel. According to James Kirchick of The Daily Beast, the WWN employed the "fascist" label to defame governments in eastern Europe which are opposed to Russian influence.

Support
The 2010 conference, where WWN was founded, received letters of support from Hillary Clinton and from the Ukrainian prime minister, and was attended by Ukraine's minister of education and the Israeli minister without portfolio.

Russian foreign minister Lavrov referred to WWN in a meeting held with Russian NGO representatives in March, 2011, pointing it out as a leading example of NGOs working to "counter attempts to rewrite and distort history, primarily the outcome of World War II." Lavrov also praised WWN for its actions in support of Lithuanian Socialist People's Front leader Algirdas Paleckis, who was accused of justifying the armed aggression by the Soviet Union against a popular gathering in Lithuania in 1991.

The WWN 2012 conference in Moscow was organised under the auspices of the Secretary-General of the Council of Europe and in cooperation with the Federation Council of Russia.

Members
WWN is an umbrella organization for 131 different organizations. According to Estonian Security Police, many of the member organizations are involved in carrying out the Russian policy of compatriots or implementing Russian informational influence in target countries. Johan Bäckman is a board member and a leader of the Finnish Anti-Fascist Committee. The South Ossetian Republic is considered an independent state by WWN and the South Ossetian Anti-Fascist Committee (Юго-Осетинский антифашистский комитет) is also a full member of MBN. Some member organizations are considered extremist by Estonian security forces. For example, WWN's management board has two Estonian resident representatives, Maksim Reva and Andrei Zarenkov, who the Estonian Security Police describes as radical nationalists who promote Russian chauvinism.

After the creation of WWN in 2010, some member organizations in different countries have renamed themselves to show they are subsidiaries of WWN: e.g. America Without Nazism, Natsivaba Eesti (Estonia without Nazism) and Rossija Bez Natsisma (RBN).

Organisation
The founder and chairman of World Without Nazism is Boris Spiegel, a member of the Russian Federation Council, who is described by an opinion piece in Haaretz as a Kremlin-connected oligarch. The MBN presidium consists of 15 persons from different countries. In addition to the presidium, MBN has another wider ruling body, MBN Sovet (Council), which consists of 39 members (including 15 members of the Presidium). Additional five members, among them MEP Tatjana Ždanoka, are included in the MBN Sovet according to "a separate list".

In 2014 statement regarding the war in Ukraine the organization had said that:

The absence of the international community's reaction can repeat the Kristallnacht [Night of Broken Glass] for non-Ukrainians and other ethnic minorities,

Presidium
The following individual are members of the presidium:
1. Boris Spiegel, president (Russia)
2. Alexander Pochinok, first vice-president (Russia)
3. Valery Engel, first vice-president (Russia)
4. Leonid Bard, chairman of "America without Nazism" (USA)
5. Gert Weisskirchen (Germany)
6. Eliza Goroya, lawyer, Greek Helsinki Monitor (Greece)
7. Hanna Herman, counselor to the President of Ukraine (Ukraine)
8. Andrei Zarenkov, chairman "Estonia without Nazism" (Estonia).
9. Joseph Koren, chairman of "Latvia without Nazism" (Latvia).
10. Mikhail Ostrovsky, deputy secretary of Russian Civic Chamber, chairman of "Russia without Nazism"(Russia)
11. Algirdas Paleckis, chairman of "Lithuania without Nazism", chairman of the "Socialist People's Front" political party (Lithuania).
12. Michael Raif, chairman of 'Russian Community' (Israel).
13. Alexander Sokolov, member of Russian Civic Chamber (Russia).
14. Inna Supac. Parliamentarian of the Republic of Moldova, chairman of "Moldavia without Nazism"

Activities
WWN organised several conferences and a picket in Estonia in 2011. Five WWN members who are also members of the New York State Assembly wrote an open letter to the Prime Minister of Estonia, Andrus Ansip, after he called the WWN extremist.

Monitoring reports on the following countries are published on the WWN website: Bulgaria, Hungary, Latvia, Lithuania, Moldova, Italy, Ukraine, Finland, Estonia, and Russia.

WWN expressed concerns on the rise of xenophobic, racist and anti-semitic tendencies in Russian society after Manezhnaya square riots of December 11, 2010.

WWN states "the tendency to equate Soviet and the Nazi regime against a background of rapid nazification and radicalization of social consciousness in the former communist bloc" is not a coincidence. It advocates "a wide open scientific discussion on the history of the twentieth century, which could shed some light on the crimes of totalitarian regimes and the role of the Western democracies in the outbreak of World War II." It also proposes a common history textbook for all of Europe based on "serious scientific study, as well as the decisions of international judicial and political authorities on which basis the postwar world order had been built".

See also
 Historiography in the Soviet Union
 Presidential Commission of the Russian Federation to Counter Attempts to Falsify History to the Detriment of Russia's Interests
 Russian influence operations in Estonia
 2022 Moscow rally

Notes

References

External links 
 Without Nazism (official website)

Historiography of the Soviet Union
Historiography of Russia
Political history of Russia
Holodomor
Anti-fascist organizations
Politics of Russia
Russian nationalist organizations
Organizations established in 2010
Organizations based in Moscow
2010 establishments in Russia